Orvasca is a genus of tussock moths in the family Erebidae. The genus was erected by Francis Walker in 1865.

Species
The following species are included in the genus:
Orvasca aliena Butler, 1886
Orvasca ashleyi Holloway, 1999
Orvasca aurantiaca Hampson, 1893
Orvasca bicolor Heylaerts, 1892
Orvasca brunneva Holloway, 1999
Orvasca dimorphissima Holloway, 1994
Orvasca dolichocera Collenette, 1938
Orvasca eva Schintlmeister, 1994
Orvasca flavocinerea van Eecke, 1928
Orvasca fulvonigra Swinhoe, 1903
Orvasca kilanas Holloway, 1999
Orvasca lavella Bethune-Baker, 1910
Orvasca limbata Butler, 1881
Orvasca panabra Turner, 1902
Orvasca paradoxa Butler, 1886
Orvasca primula Holloway, 1999
Orvasca rufalba Holloway, 1976
Orvasca sciasticta Collenette, 1938
Orvasca semifusca Walker, 1869
Orvasca subnotata Walker, 1865
Orvasca vespertilionis Holloway, 1976
Orvasca waterstradti Holloway, 1976

References

Lymantriinae
Noctuoidea genera